Marcelo Augusto Ferreira Teixeira (born 13 October 1987), known as Marcelo Goiano, is a Brazilian professional footballer who plays as a defender.

Club career
Born in Goias, Marcelo Goiano played for various clubs in the lower leagues. He spent the 2012–13 season on loan at  Portuguese club Feirense from Grêmio Anápolis. He made 25 appearances for the Segunda Liga club before being loaned to Portugal again, this time in the top-flight Primeira Liga to join Académica. The following season, he signed for Braga on a four-year contract.

Honours
Braga
Taça de Portugal: 2015–16

References

External links

1987 births
Sportspeople from Goiás
Living people
Association football defenders
Brazilian footballers
Esporte Clube XV de Novembro (Jaú) players
C.D. Feirense players
Associação Académica de Coimbra – O.A.F. players
S.C. Braga players
Sivasspor footballers
Liga Portugal 2 players
Primeira Liga players
Süper Lig players
Brazilian expatriate footballers
Expatriate footballers in Portugal
Brazilian expatriate sportspeople in Portugal
Expatriate footballers in Turkey
Brazilian expatriate sportspeople in Turkey